The 1996 Caribbean Cup (also known as the Shell/Umbro Caribbean Cup for sponsorship reasons), was the 8th edition of the Caribbean Cup, the biennial football championship of the Caribbean region (CFU). It was held in Trinidad, where it began on 24 May 1996 and concluded on 7 June.

In the tournament, the hosts Trinidad and Tobago were to be joined by 7 nations who advanced from the qualification process that began in April 1996 and involved 18 Caribbean national teams.

A total of 16 games were played. Trinidad and Tobago won the tournament and landed their fifth Caribbean.

Qualifying Tournament

Group 1

First round

Netherlands Antilles withdrew and the return round was not played

Second round

Group 2

All matches were played in Basseterre, Saint Kitts and Nevis

Group 3
Both matches were played in Port-au-Prince, Haiti

Group 4

The return round was not played

Group 5

First round

Second round

Group 6
 withdrew

Group 7

First round

Second round

Final tournament

Group A

Group B
Played in San Fernando and Arima, Trinidad and Tobago

Semifinals

3rd Place Playoff

Finals

Caribbean Cup
Caribbean Cup
Car
International association football competitions hosted by Trinidad and Tobago